Kazinka is a rural locality (a selo) and the administrative center of Kazninskoye Rural Settlement, Valuysky District, Belgorod Oblast, Russia. The population was 1,020 as of 2010. There are 15 streets.

Geography 
Kazinka is located 22 km west of Valuyki (the district's administrative centre) by road. Posokhovo is the nearest rural locality.

References 

Rural localities in Valuysky District